Seabrook is a city in Harris County in the U.S. state of Texas, with some water surface area located within Chambers County. The population was 11,952 at the 2010 U.S. census, and 14,149 in 2019. Several fish markets line the city's waterfront, while antique shops and bed and breakfast establishments are found in the city's downtown area. The city is home to several miles of trails, which connect multiple city parks to each other.

History

Seabrook is known for its fish markets on Waterfront Drive where resident shrimpers and fishermen bring in their catches daily. Besides bordering the bay, the city encompasses marshes through which runoff from inland fields drain to the bay. The piece of land was purchased by Seabrook W. Sydnor, who was the son of a Galveston slave trader, John Seabrook Sydnor in 1895. In March 1903, the Seabrook Company of Houston created a layout of the proposed Seabrook Town site. The new town attracted fishermen, merchants and even a few residents.

The Galveston Hurricane of 1900 demolished the local school, but by 1905 it was restored and was run by three teachers who taught 100 students. The local schools became part of the Clear Creek Independent School District in 1947. The population of Seabrook rose from 200 to 560 before the Great Depression, but fell to 200 in 1936, and remained at 400 from 1940 until 1947, when the Albert and Ernest Fay shipyard opened. It could handle 150 boats, and opened up jobs and is the main cause of the population increase. Despite damage from Hurricane Carla, a bridge linking Seabrook and Kemah was completed in 1961. With the opening of the bridge and the Johnson Space Center (JSC) in Houston, Seabrook's population rose to approximately 6,000.

In 1986, the decision was made to start the construction of a fixed-span bridge that was tall enough for sailboats to pass under. After this bridge was finished, Highway 146 was linked all the way from Galveston to Texas State Highway 225. This spurred a further increase in the population of Seabrook to its present level of nearly 12,000 people. Seabrook's residents are quite diversified and are employed in a variety of professional positions. Quite a few residents have ties to the chemical and oil industry as well as the NASA space program.

Geography
Seabrook is located on Galveston Bay at Clear Lake, southeast of Houston near Pasadena and La Porte.

Climate
Seabrook has an oceanic humid subtropical climate, with consistent rainfall throughout the year, but usually with heavier amounts during the hot and humid summer months.

Demographics

The 2010 U.S. census reported Seabrook had a population of 11,952; in 2019 it increased to 14,149. The racial and ethnic makeup of the city was 71.6% non-Hispanic white, 5.1% Black and African American, 2.2% Asian, 1.9% multiracial, and 20.7% Hispanic and Latin American of any race at the 2019 American Community Survey. As of the 2020 United States census, there were 13,618 people, 5,368 households, and 3,358 families residing in the city.

There were 5,479 households in 2019 with an average of 2.54 people per household. The median gross rent in the city was $1,161 and the median cost of an owner-occupied housing unit without a mortgage was $753. Seabrook's population had a median household income of $89,817 from 2015–2019 and per capita income of $47,447. Of the population, an estimated 8.5% lived at or below the poverty line within the city limits.

At the census of 2000, there were 9,443 people, 4,094 households, and 2,386 families residing in the city. The population density was 1,647.5 people per square mile (636.3/km2). There were 4,536 housing units at an average density of 791.4 per square mile (305.6/km2). The racial makeup of the city was 88.92% White, 2.11% African American, 0.51% Native American, 3.31% Asian, 0.02% Pacific Islander, 2.76% from other races, and 2.36% from two or more races. Hispanic or Latino of any race were 10.77% of the population.

There were 4,094 households, out of which 29.4% had children under the age of 18 living with them, 46.8% were married couples living together, 8.1% had a female householder with no husband present, and 41.7% were non-families. 34.0% of all households were made up of individuals, and 3.3% had someone living alone who was 65 years of age or older. The average household size was 2.31 and the average family size was 3.01.

In the city, the population was spread out, with 23.9% under the age of 18, 9.3% from 18 to 24, 38.4% from 25 to 44, 22.8% from 45 to 64, and 5.7% who were 65 years of age or older. The median age was 34 years. For every 100 females, there were 106.9 males. For every 100 females age 18 and over, there were 105.1 males.

The median income for a household in the city was $54,175, and the median income for a family was $66,815. Males had a median income of $50,322 versus $32,161 for females. The per capita income for the city was $29,534. About 2.8% of families and 5.5% of the population were below the poverty line, including 6.1% of those under age 18 and 5.1% of those age 65 or over.

The greater Seabrook postal area also includes the incorporated cities, both small suburban subdivisions organized as municipalities, of El Lago, Texas, and Taylor Lake Village.

Arts and culture

A historic downtown area was constructed in the early 20th century and it stands today, with many locals running their businesses. Most are antique shops or bed and breakfast places.

Seabrook is host to the Texas Concours d'Elegance "Keels & Wheels" classic car and boat show held each year the first weekend in May at Lakewood Yacht Club. The Seabrook Festival of the Arts is held annually on the grounds of Seabrook City Hall and Community House at First Street, where artists exhibit paintings, sculpture, textiles, jewelry, wood works, photography and musical performances by Texas musicians. The festival is sponsored by the City of Seabrook in cooperation with the Art Consortium of the Texas Gulf Coast.

Parks and recreation

Pelican Project

The goal of the Pelican Path Project has been to improve Seabrook's identity as a community and one of the largest migratory paths in North America, and a bird sanctuary to both the brown and white pelicans. The project also displays connectedness of the city by its many bed and breakfasts, close family values, available water attractions and its unique downtown of small businesses.

Most businesses in Seabrook have purchased a pelican from Pelican Project and have customized it to represent their type of business, as well as the city of Seabrook. This project has not only attracted tourism to Seabrook, but united the businesses of the city. Artists from all over Texas have participated in this project, which has attracted future plans for more cultural art projects in Seabrook.

Seabrook trail system
The trail system was built from crushed granite, which connects most of the city's parks, including Robinson and Pine Gully Parks. The trail system traverses habitats for a wide variety of wildlife.

In addition to the city being designated as a bird sanctuary, the city includes four sites on the Great Texas Coastal Birding Trail. The only other site in the Clear Lake area on this Texas trail is the Armand Bayou Nature Center.

Education

Primary and secondary schools

Pupils in Seabrook attend schools in Clear Creek Independent School District. The community is within the Board of Trustees District 1, represented by Robert Allan Davee as of 2008. CCISD was established in 1948, partly from the former Seabrook school district. The former Seabrook district served up to junior high school with high schoolers going to Webster.

Most Seabrook residents are zoned to James F. Bay Elementary School, which was originally known as Seabrook Elementary but was renamed in 1969 to honor the principal who had served for many years. Some residents are zoned to Ed White Elementary School in El Lago, which was built in 1965 and was named after Ed White, the famous astronaut who died in the fire working on the Apollo mission.

All Seabrook residents are zoned to Seabrook Intermediate School (Seabrook). Seabrook Intermediate also houses the Science Magnet Program, which offers an enriched Science curriculum with many outside science activities. This program is an application-process program and the students accepted are gifted in the field of science. Seabrook Intermediate also houses the Living Materials Center, which is the home for over 60 species of animals. The Living Materials Center is available to all students in the school and throughout the district.

All Seabrook residents are zoned to Clear Falls High School in League City. Residents were previously zoned to Clear Lake High School in Clear Lake City, Houston.

Colleges and universities
The portion of Clear Creek ISD in Harris County (and therefore Seabrook) is assigned to San Jacinto College.

Infrastructure and services
The Harris County Public Library Evelyn Meador Branch serves the community. The library opened on June 26, 1988. The original planning of the library started in 1985 when five Seabrook residents met Harris County Commissioner Jim Fonteno. The library suffered enough damage from Hurricane Ike that it was completely rebuilt.  The new, larger library reopened on June 28, 2011.

Harris County Transit previously operated public transportation in Seabrook. The Seabrook Post Office is located at 1600 Second Street.

The Seabrook Volunteer Fire Department (SVFD) provides fire protection and medical first responder services to the city. The FD operates out of two stations and also has a fire boat docked at a local boat marina. SVFD is staffed entirely by volunteer firefighters. Equipment operated by SVFD includes: 
3 engines
1 tower truck
1 rescue truck 
1 rehab truck
2 utility pick-up trucks
3 chief vehicles
1 fire boat
2 rescue boats

Harris County Youth Village, a juvenile detention facility, is located in Pasadena, but has a Seabrook postal address.

Harris Health System (formerly Harris County Hospital District) designated Strawberry Health Center in Pasadena for ZIP code 77586. The nearest public hospital is Ben Taub General Hospital in the Texas Medical Center.

Damage from Hurricane Ike

The city of Seabrook was under mandatory evacuation for Hurricane Ike on the morning of September 13, 2008. Hurricane Ike was the 3rd most destructive hurricane to hit the United States. In Seabrook, the storm surge not only knocked out the streets as a means of transportation, but also knocked the power out for the entire city, along with many others. Because Seabrook is surrounded by water, the aftermath of debris and boats on the roads was phenomenal from all of the boat docks close to shore.  Seabrook residents were left without power and running water for up to a month after Hurricane Ike made landfall.

A month after the hurricane, Seabrook was still dealing with people not being able to live in the conditions, even after the Federal Emergency Management Agency (FEMA) came. The students zoned to schools in the Clear Creek Independent School District (which are all the residents in Seabrook) missed almost three weeks of school due to the evacuation and the damage to buildings and roads in the Seabrook and surrounding areas.

Sister cities

On June 19, 2002 the cities of Seabrook and Isla Santa Cruz, Ecuador finalized a sister city status during a ceremony at Seabrook City Hall. As part of the agreements the City of Seabrook planned to build a $500,000 ($733,024 adjusted for inflation ),  Ecuador visitors' center, which was to include a museum, a multimedia cultural center, and retail shops. Ecuador stated that it had secured $450,000 of the funds as of January 1, 2004. In May 2004 the city asked for an additional $150,000 in private funding and stated that the center may not be built if it does not get this funding.

See also
 Greater Houston
 Galveston Bay Area

References

External links
 City of Seabrook official website
 Seabrook Tourism
 
 Seabrook Intermediate School
 Bay Elementary School
 South Seabrook Marine District Waterfront Redevelopment Study

Cities in Chambers County, Texas
Cities in Galveston County, Texas
Cities in Harris County, Texas
Cities in Texas
Galveston Bay Area
Greater Houston
Populated coastal places in Texas